Nigeria competed at the 2019 African Games held from 19 to 31 August 2019 in Rabat, Morocco. In total, 308 athletes represented Nigeria at the games. Athletes representing Nigeria won 46 gold medals, 33 silver medals and 48 bronze medals and the country finished 2nd in the medal table.

Medal summary

Medal table 

|  style="text-align:left; width:78%; vertical-align:top;"|

3x3 basketball 

Nigeria competed in 3x3 basketball. The men's team won the bronze medal in the men's tournament and the women's team won the gold medal in the women's tournament.

Athletics 

In total 51 athletes were selected for competing in athletics at the 2019 African Games.

Male athletes 

 Divine Oduduru
 Seye Ogunlewe
 Oyeniyi Abejoye
 Enoch Adegoke
 Shedrack Akpeki
 Rilwan Alowonle
 Emmanuel Arowolo
 Nnamdi Chinecherem
 Ogho-Oghene Egwero
 Raymond Ekevwo
 Chukwuebuka Enekwechi
 Orukpe Eraiyokan
 Edose Ibadin
 Usheoritse Itsekiri
 Samuel Kure
 Samson Nathaniel
 Ayomidotun Ogundeji
 Ifeanyi Ojeli
 Chidi Okezie
 Aiyowieren Osadolor
 Sikiru Adeyemi
 Best Ephire

Female athletes 

 Blessing Okagbare
 Ese Brume
 Bukola Adekunle
 Uwemedino Abasiono Akpan
 Aniekeme Alphonsus
 Doreen Amata
 Tobi Amusan
 Grace Anigbata
 Rosemary Chukwuma
 Oluwakemi Francis
 Patience Okon George
 Esther Isiah
 Princess Kara
 Mercy Ntia-Obong
 Kelechi Nwanaga
 Queen Obisesan
 Favour Ofili
 Revelation Ogini
 Blessing Ogundiran
 Temilola Ogunrinde
 Oyesade Olatoye
 Fadekemi Olude
 Chioma Onyekwere
 Rita Ossai
 Joy Udo-Gabriel
 Amarachi Obi
 Blessing Oladoye
 Grace Nwokocha

Results 

In total ten gold medals, seven silver medals and six bronze medals were won and the country finished 1st in the athletics medal table.

Raymond Ekevwo won the gold medal in the men's 100 metres event and Usheoritse Itsekiri won the bronze medal in that event.

Divine Oduduru won the gold medal in the men's 200 metres event.

Chidi Okezie won the bronze medal in the men's 400 metres event.

Oyeniyi Abejoye won the silver medal in the men's 110 metres hurdles event.

Nigeria won the silver medal in the men's 4 × 100 metres relay event and Nigeria won the bronze medal in the men's 4 × 400 metres relay event.
Chukwuebuka Enekwechi won the gold medal in the men's shot put event.

Dotun Ogundeji won the silver medal in the men's discus throw event.

Badminton 

Nigeria competed in badminton. Twelve players registered in the mixed team event, and won the mixed team gold after beat Algeria with the score 3–0 in the final on 25 August.

Anuoluwapo Juwon Opeyori won the gold medal in the men's singles event. Godwin Olofua won a bronze medal in that event. Together they won the silver medal in the men's doubles event.

Dorcas Ajoke Adesokan won the silver medal in the women's singles event. Sofiat Arinola Obanishola won a bronze medal in that event.

Dorcas Ajoke Adesokan and Uchechukwu Deborah Ukeh won the silver medal in the women's doubles event.

Enejoh Abah and Peace Orji won a bronze medal in the mixed doubles event.

Boxing 

Nigeria competed in boxing. Boxers representing Nigeria won one gold medal, one silver medal and five bronze medals and the country finished in 5th place in the boxing medal table.

Bolanle Temitope Shogbamu won the gold medal in the women's welterweight (69kg) event.

Abdul-afeez Ayoola Osoba won the silver medal in the men's welterweight (69kg) event.

Solomon Adebayo won a bronze medal in the men's super heavyweight (+91kg) event.

Ayisat Morenikeji Oriyomi won a bronze medal in the women's flyweight (51kg) event.

Elizabeth Temitayo Oshoba won a bronze medal in the women's featherweight (57kg) event.

Fadilat Tijani won a bronze medal in the women's lightweight (60kg) event.

Toyin Adejumola won a bronze medal in the women's middleweight (75kg) event.

Canoeing 

Nigeria competed in canoeing.

Ayomide Emmanuel Bello won the gold medals in the women's C-1 200 metres and C-1 500 metres events. As a result of Bello's win in the C-1 200 metres event Nigeria qualified a single boat in canoeing for the 2020 Summer Olympics. Bello and Tubereferia Goodness Foloki also won the gold medals in the women's C-2 200 metres and C-2 500 metres events.

Chess 

Nigeria competed in chess. Four chess players competed: Oladapo Olutola Adu, Toritsemuwa Ofowino, Perpetual Eloho Ogbiyoyo and Abimbola Ayotomiwa Osunfuyi. They did not win any medals.

Cycling 

Nigeria competed both in road cycling and mountain bike cycling.

Football 

Nigeria competed in football at the 2019 African Games, both in the men's tournament and the women's tournament. The men's team won the silver medal and the women's team won the gold medal.

Gymnastics 

Uche Eke, born in America, represented Nigeria at the 2019 African Games in gymnastics. He won Nigeria's first ever gold medal in gymnastics, in the pommel horse event and a bronze medal in the parallel bars event. The women's team also won the bronze medal in the team all-around event.

Judo 

Eight athletes were scheduled to compete in judo. In total, four athletes competed in judo: Michael Agbo, Victoria Agbodobiri, David Damilare Joseph and Sarah Echi Umar.

Handball 

Both Nigeria's national handball team and women's national handball team competed in handball at the 2019 African Games.

The men's team reached the quarterfinals and finished in 6th place.

The women's team finished in 9th place.

Karate 

Nigeria competed in karate. Eight athletes were scheduled to compete: Hope Adele, Rustum Francis Bernard, Blessing James, Rita Omoshuka Ogene, Elizabeth Komeno Oghenevwogaga, Aderonke Oluwatosin Ogunsanwo, Oluwaseun Benjamin Olorunbe and Joseph Olima Omu.

Hope Adele won one of the bronze medals in the men's kumite +84 kg event.

Rowing 

Nigeria is scheduled to compete in rowing. Eight athletes are scheduled to compete: David Richard Bello, Janet Deborah David, Michael Akpos Moses, Glory Abu Semidara, Adeola Tibiebiere Smart, Samuel Eboibue Suku, Esther Tamaramiyebi Toko and Sadiq Yahaya.

Shooting 

Nigeria is scheduled to compete in shooting. Madu Abdul, Elaochi Evans Adoyi, Okposo Esugo and Kate Iruoghene Otiti are scheduled to compete.

Swimming 

Nigeria competed in swimming. Four swimmers were scheduled to compete: Phillip Adejumo, Timipame-ere Akiayefa, Abibat Moyosore Ogunbanwo and Yellow Naikegy Yeiyah.

Table tennis 

Nigeria competed in table tennis.

Quadri Aruna and Olufunke Oshonaike were scheduled to compete in table tennis.

In the men's singles event Olajide Omotayo won the gold medal, Quadri Aruna won the silver medal and Segun Toriola won a bronze medal.

Toriola and Olajide Omotayo won a bronze medal in the men's doubles event.

Aruna, Toriola and Omotayo also won the silver medal in the men's team event.

Taekwondo 

Nigerian athletes competed in Taekwondo. In total, one gold medal and five bronze medals were won and the country finished in 6th place in the Taekwondo medal table.

Tennis 

Nigeria competed in tennis. Eight tennis players were scheduled to compete: Aanu Enita Mercy Aiyegbusi, Blessing Samuel Audu, Emmanuel Sunday Audu, Sylvester Emmanuel, Adesuwa Osabuohien, Thomas Omang Otuu, Barakat Quadre and Joseph Imeh Ubong.

Barakat Quadre and Adesuwa Osabuohien won a bronze medal in the women's doubles event.

Together with Blessing Samuel Audu and Aanu Enita Mercy Aiyegbusi they also won a bronze medal in the women's team event.

Volleyball 

Nigeria's men's team competed in the men's tournament. The women's team competed in the women's tournament.

Weightlifting 

Nigeria competed in weightlifting. In total, weightlifters representing Nigeria won 16 gold medals, 13 silver medals and 18 bronze medals and the country finished 2nd in the weightlifting medal table.

Wrestling 

Nigeria competed in wrestling.

Odunayo Adekuoroye, Blessing Oborududu, Aminat Adeniyi, Blessing Onyebuchi, Mercy Genesis, Bose Samuel, Amas Daniel, Sinivie Boltic, Soso Tamarau, Melvin Bibo, Ebikewenimo Welson, Ogbonna John, Emmanuel Nworie, Ikechukwu Robinson, Tochukwu Okeke and Alfred Pakistan were scheduled to represent Nigeria at the 2019 African Games in wrestling.

References 

Nations at the 2019 African Games
2019
African Games